Trouble Backstairs (German:Krach im Hinterhaus) may refer to:

 Trouble Backstairs (play), a German play by Maximilian Böttcher 
 Trouble Backstairs (1935 film), a German film directed by Veit Harlan
 Trouble Backstairs (1949 film), a German film directed by Erich Kobler

See also
  Krach im Vorderhaus (play), a sequel to the original play 
 Krach im Vorderhaus (film), a German film directed by Paul Heidemann